Mart Saar ( in Hüpassaare – 28 October 1963) was an Estonian composer, organist and collector of folk songs.

Childhood

Saar was born at the small borough of Hüpassaare (now in Karjasoo, Suure-Jaani Parish), Kreis Fellin in the Livonian Governorate of the Russian Empire (now Estonia), to Mihkel and Ann Saar (née Kimmel). His father was employed in the forestry business. He was the eldest of fours siblings; Anna (1885–1968), Hans (1895–1979) and Jaan (1897–1898). He received his education in the village school at Kaansoo and the Suure-Jaani Parish school. His music teacher in the Suure-Jaani parish school was Joosep Kapp, the father of Artur Kapp, another famous Estonian composer. Additionally, Saar's father was a talented organist, who gave him lessons at home.

Adult life
In 1901, Saar left home to study music at the Saint Petersburg Conservatory.  He graduated in 1908 but chose to continue his studies.  After graduation in 1911, he became a music teacher in Tartu. Ten years later, in 1921, he moved to Tallinn, Estonia as a freelance composer and organist. He spent his summers in his native borough Hüpassaare.

In August 1915, he married Elise Paalmann. The couple had two children; a daughter Heli (1917–1975) and a son, Ülo (1927–1945). The marriage ended in divorce when Elise moved to the United States in 1937, initially expecting Saar to join her. However, Saar decided that he didn't wish to leave Estonia. Saar later married Magda Elisabeth Takk and had a daughter named Tuuli.

Career
Early in his career, Saar was influenced by the European music of the early 19th century.

Later in his life, Saar combined Estonian folk music with more contemporary sounds. He mixed vocals into his symphonies. In addition to composing, Saar also wrote lyrics to some of his songs.  Usually, these lyrics express a love for Estonia and nature. They also address the brevity of life. Saar's lyrics have been compared to the poetry of Anna Haava and Juhan Liiv.

Selected works
Works for mixed chorus include:
Põhjavaim (Northern Spirit)
Seitse Sammeldunud Sängi (Seven Moss-Clad Tombs)
Oh Kodumaa (Oh, My Homeland)
Mis Sa Nutad, tammekene? (Why Are You Weeping, Oak Tree?)
Kõver Kuuseke (Crooked Fir)
Mälestus (A Memory)
Allik (Wellspring)

Works for male choir include:
Küll ma Laulaks (I Would Sing)

Works for female choir include:
Päikesele (To The Sun)

Solo songs include:
Must Lind (Black Bird)
Lauliku Talveüksindus (Singer's Winter Loneliness)

Piano music includes:
20 Rahvaviisi (20 Folk Songs)
Eesti Süidid (Estonian Suites)
Prelüüd ja Fuuga G-duur (Prelude and Fugue in G)
Humoresk (Humoresque)
Skizze (Preludes)

References

 Mart Saar Biography 
 Examples of Saar's piano music; short biography

1882 births
1963 deaths
People from Põhja-Sakala Parish
People from Kreis Fellin
Estonian organists
Male organists
Estonian folk-song collectors
Male classical composers
20th-century classical composers
20th-century organists
20th-century Estonian composers
20th-century Estonian musicians
20th-century male musicians
Saint Petersburg Conservatory alumni
People's Artists of the Estonian Soviet Socialist Republic
Recipients of the Order of the Red Banner of Labour